This is a list of the wheelchair tennis champions at the Grand Slam and the Wheelchair Tennis Masters events in the women's division since the introduction of the NEC Tour in 1992. Champions from the wheelchair tennis events at the Paralympic Games are also included.

Some entries have an asterisk (*) linking to the tournament article.

Champions by year

Wheelchair women's singles

Wheelchair women's doubles

Champions list

Wheelchair women's singles

Wheelchair women's doubles

Grand Slam achievements

Grand Slam 
Players who held all four Grand Slam titles simultaneously (in a calendar year).

Wheelchair women's singles

Wheelchair women's doubles

Non-calendar year Grand Slam 
Players who held all four Grand Slam titles simultaneously (not in a calendar year).

Wheelchair women's singles

Career Grand Slam 
Players who won all four Grand Slam titles over the course of their careers.

 The event at which the Career Grand Slam was completed indicated in bold

Wheelchair women's singles

Wheelchair women's doubles

Individual

Team

Golden Slam 
Players who won all four Grand Slam titles and the Paralympic gold medal simultaneously (in a calendar year).

Wheelchair women's singles

Career Golden Slam 
Players who won all four Grand Slam titles and the Paralympic gold medal over the course of their careers.

 The event at which the Career Golden Slam was completed indicated in bold

Wheelchair women's singles

Wheelchair women's doubles

Super Slam 
Players who won all four Grand Slam titles, the Paralympic gold medal and the year-end championship simultaneously (in a calendar year).

Wheelchair women's singles

Career Super Slam 
Players who won all four Grand Slam titles, the Paralympic gold medal and the year-end championship over the course of their careers.

 The event at which the Career Super Slam was completed indicated in bold

Wheelchair women's singles

Wheelchair women's doubles

Multiple titles in a season

Three titles in a single season 
Note: players who won 4 titles in a season are not included here.

Wheelchair women's singles

Wheelchair women's doubles

Surface Slam 
Players who won Grand Slam titles on clay, grass and hard courts in a calendar year.

Wheelchair women's singles

Wheelchair women's doubles

Channel Slam 
Players who won the French Open-Wimbledon double.

Wheelchair women's singles

Wheelchair women's doubles

See also 

 List of men's wheelchair tennis champions
List of quad wheelchair tennis champions

References

External links 

 UNIQLO wheelchair tennis tour (ITF)

Wheelchair tennis
Wheelchair Women's